Georg Gottlob Richter (4 February 1694 – 28 May 1773) was a professor of medicine, philosophy, and philology.

Education
Before receiving his MD degree, Richter spent a year (1718) in Leiden listening to the lectures of Herman Boerhaave. He then obtained his MD under Johann Ludwig Hannemann at the University of Kiel in 1720.

Career
He occupied first chair of medicine at the University of Göttingen. Richter wrote a text on dietetics and numerous dissertations on medical theory and practice.

Works
 Lebensordnung für Gesunde und Kranke . Pfähler, Heidelberg 1786 Digital edition by the University and State Library Düsseldorf

External links
 Richter at the Scientific Commons
 Richter at the MedSpace archive
 Books by Richter

18th-century German physicians
German philosophers
1694 births
1773 deaths
18th-century German male writers